Joseph Holmes, better known as Young Seph, is an American music producer and songwriter born in Sierra Vista, Arizona. Young Seph has produced for artists such as 50 Cent, Jim Jones, Lloyd Banks, Troy Ave, Rocko Young Buck and Havoc, among others.

Music career
Young Seph landed his first major placement in 2009 on Jim Jones 4th studio album Pray IV Reign. In late 2010, Lloyd Banks confirmed production from Seph on his most recently released album H.F.M. 2. 
Sephs' most recent work was released on March 17, 2011  "Boomerang" 11 out of 11 Freestyle by 50 Cent.

In early 2012 Seph was featured in Red Bull's National Super Bowl TV Commercial "Red Bull Gives You Wings 60", featuring Blake Griffin and other Red Bull sponsored professional athletes.

In early 2019 started the YoungSeph.com, an Online Beat Store for Artist, Labels, and Films/Commercials looking for music production, hooks & or Songs. The website also features beat tutorials, live studio sessions, and more.

Production credits and discography

Jim Jones – Pray IV Reign (album) (2009)
13. "Pop Off" featuring NOE & Mel Matrix

50 Cent (2009)
 "Follow Instructions"

Havoc – From Now On (mixtape) (2009)
10. "Believer"
17. "H is Back" [Single]

Nu Jerzey Devil – Mr.Red Karpet (album) (2009)
15. "Ready or not"

Mica Swain and Waka Flocka Flame – [single] (2009) 
 "Body Talk"

Havoc – (2010)
"The Warm Up"

Tony Yayo and Joe Young – (2010)
"Semi (I'm a Rider)"

Young Buck and Savion Saddam – (2010)
"Gettin Money"

Lloyd Banks – H.F.M. 2 (Hunger for More 2) (Album) (2010)
14. "This is the Life" co.produced by Cardiak50 Cent (2011)
 "Boomerang" (Freestyle) JRand [single] (2012) 
"Up Against The Wall"

 JRand [remix] (2012) 
"Up Against The Wall" Remix Featuring Juicy J , Juvenile, Doe B

Young Buck and Savion Saddam – Salute to the Streetz (album) (2012)
1. "Salute"
2. "My City" (Remix)3. "Put It All on the Line"
4. "Birdshit"
5. "Shine on Em'"
6. "Mr. Sportscenter (Throw Away Money)" 
7. "Gangsta Dick"
8. "If I Had U"
9. "Rucker"
10. "Bang Dat"
11. "Tourchure"
12. "Word Iz"
13. "He Snitchin"
14. "Struggling"

 Savion Saddam – [single] (2016)
"Cook Out" featuring Young Seph & Joe Green

 JSlugg500 (2016)
"Charge It to the Game" Featuring Nano"

 JSlugg500 (2016)
"Fuk it Up"

 JSlugg500 – [single] (2016)
Dolla Signz"

Joe Green x Savion Saddam x Young Seph - (2017)
"Trap Door" (Single)

Savion Saddam x Joe Green x Young Seph – J.ealous O.nes E.nvy (Mixtape) (2017)
1. "Turnt 2 The Max" Featuring Young Seph
2. "All Day Featuring Young Seph
3. "Money Call" Featuring Young Seph
4. "Cookout" Featuring Young Seph 
5. "Trap Door" 
6. "Real Niggaz"
7. "Social Media" Featuring Young Buck & Chapo
8. "Count It Up" Featuring Young Seph
9. "Cash Flow" Featuring Young Seph
10. "BullSh*t" Featuring Young Seph
11. "Never" Featuring Young Seph
12. "All the Way Up" Featuring Young Seph

Young Buck – Box of Chocolates (Ep) (2019)
2. "Take Your Time"
3. "Put it on Me”

Young Buck – Compulsive (Ep) (2019)
1. "Check"
2. "Club Sensations”
5. "Roll Up"
6. "Move"
10. "Appreciate Me"

Young Buck – The Impeachment (Ep) (2019)
3. "Highway"
5. "Democratic Party”
6. "Us Treasury"
9. "Gangsta Walk"
10. "Republican Party"
12. "Tear Drop"
17. "Lose Me"

Young Buck – Outbreak (Ep) (2020)
1. "Whats Up"
2. "All We Do”
3. "Signed Up"
4. "So Do I"
5. "Step"
6. "Do You Challenge"

Young Buck – [single] (2020) 
 "Together"

Young Buck – Compulsive (Ep) (2019)
1. "Check"
2. "Club Sensations”
5. “Roll up”
6. “Move”
10. ”Appreciate Me”

References

External links
YoungSeph.com
YSPBeatClub.com

Record producers from Arizona
Living people
People from Sierra Vista, Arizona
1987 births